Lúc Lắc Vietnamese Kitchen, or simply Lúc Lắc, is a Vietnamese restaurant in Portland, Oregon's Leon Chung Company Building, in the United States.

Description and history

Lúc Lắc is a counter service style Vietnamese restaurant co-owned by Adam and Alan Ho. The restaurant opened in November 2011, following Pho PDX's rebranding and relocation. Menu options include crispy rolls, mussels, pho, steak rolls, and sugarcane shrimp. The "Sassy Sour" is the restaurant's best selling drink. Ca Phe Cola is also on the drink menu. Lúc Lắc has been described as a "cozy Vietnamese sandwich shop/cocktail bar".

In 2012, Willamette Week Kelly Clarke said of the Vietnamese restaurant's interior: "The decor ... is as delightfully baroque as its drink ingredients. A horseshoe of tall-backed, red-leather banquettes surround a huge oval-shaped wood bar painted bright teal. One entire wall is devoted to a stunning, graffiti-ish mural of capering Chinese dragon heads while a flock of pink parasols hang from the high ceiling. It's a fun, fabulous place to eat and drink, like a long lost Asian set piece from The Umbrellas of Cherbourg." According to Michael Russell of The Oregonian, "Happy hour is more relaxed, with inexpensive Vietnamese appetizers and inventive cocktails served under the pink parasols hanging from the ceiling." Lúc Lắc began participating in Amazon's Prime Now service in 2015.

Reception

The restaurant won in the "Best Pho" category in Willamette Week annual "Best of Portland Readers' Poll" in 2015; Lúc Lắc also received "honorable mention" in the "Best Baguette" category. The Oregonian Michael Russell ranked Lúc Lắc number 26 on his 2016 list of "Portland's best late-night eats". In 2017, readers ranked Lúc Lắc number five in The Oregonian list of the city's "best inexpensive restaurants".

In 2018, Eater Portland'''s Nick Woo has described Lúc Lắc as "hip and loud", and included the restaurant in his list of "14 Soul-Soothing Noodle Soups in Portland". Thrillist called the restaurant a "late-night pho oasis". In 2019, Willamette Week included the restaurant in its list of "Five Places to Eat Cheap After Hours", saying: "Luc Lac is one of the very few spots where you can stuff your drunken craw with delightful, heaping takes on Vietnamese classics in the wee hours of the morn." The business was included in Eater Portland's 2022 overview of "Where to Eat and Drink in Downtown Portland".

See also
 List of Vietnamese restaurants

References

External links

 
 Luc Lac Vietnamese Kitchen at Portland Monthly''
 Luc Lac Vietnamese Kitchen at Thrillist

2011 establishments in Oregon
Restaurants established in 2011
Southwest Portland, Oregon
Vietnamese restaurants in Portland, Oregon